JimJam is an international children's preschool television channel which originally launched in Italy on Sky in 2006.

JimJam is available across Europe and Africa.

History
JimJam was launched on 1 October 2006. In September 2007, HIT Entertainment and Chellomedia (European content division of Liberty Global, currently AMC Networks International) formed a joint venture to run a children's channel. The channel was advertised as international, with plans to start cable and satellite broadcast in Western and Eastern Europe and then expand broadcasting worldwide (outside the UK, Ireland, US and Canada).

The channel was expanded to Central and Eastern Europe in November 2007. By May 2008, JimJam launched in the Netherlands and Switzerland.
By 2010, the channel had been broadcast in over 50 territories in Europe, the Middle East, Asia and Africa. By August 2010, HIT Entertainment withdrew from the JimJam joint venture, leaving JimJam wholly owned by Chello Zone. HIT Entertainment was supposed to keep providing content for JimJam.
By 2013, JimJam was available to an audience of 17 million subscribers in 13 languages. The channel has been broadcast in over 60 territories in Europe, the Middle East, East Asia and Africa, with seven feeds and four localized versions.

JimJam closed in Asia-Pacific on 9 December 2014, Italy on 30 June 2015, in Austria, Germany, Switzerland, Belgium, France and the Netherlands on 1 March 2018, Cyprus, Greece, Middle East and North Africa on 1 January 2020, in the CIS Nations on 10 March 2022, and in Portugal on 1 July 2022.

A dedicated Hungarian version was launched on 1 January 2020.

A dedicated Romanian version was launched on 1 March 2020.

Programming 
As of December 2022, the following programmes air on JimJam:
 Angelina Ballerina
 Berry and Dolly
 Bing
 Bob the Builder
 Chuggington
 Conni
 Fireman Sam
 Guess How Much I Love You
 Harry and His Bucket Full of Dinosaurs
 Heroes of the City
 Hurray for Huckle
 Inui
 Kate and Mim-Mim
 Kipper
 Leo the Wildlife Ranger
 Mumfie
 Oswald
 Pettson and Findus
 Poppets Town (is removed in March 2023)
 Postman Pat Special Delivery Service
 Ricky Zoom
 Ruff-Ruff, Tweet and Dave
 Simon
 Strawberry Shortcake's Berry Bitty Adventures
 The Adventures of Chuck and Friends
 Thomas and Friends
 Timmy Time
 Woozle and Pip

See also 
 Minimax

References

External links 

Television channels and stations established in 2006
Children's television networks
Defunct television channels in the Netherlands
Defunct television channels in Portugal
2015 disestablishments in Italy
2006 establishments in Italy
AMC Networks International
Preschool education television networks
Mattel